The TR-107 was a developmental rocket engine designed in 2002 by Northrop Grumman for NASA and DoD funded Space Launch Initiative.

History

The TR-107 was built by TRW following the successful conclusion of the development program for the  TR-106 engine, a similar throttleable engine of about half the thrust burning LOX/LH2 instead of LOX / RP-1.  Tom Mueller, then VP of Propulsion Development at Northrop, was project manager for both the TR-106 and TR-107 engines. 

In 2002, Mueller co-founded SpaceX with Elon Musk and became the VP of propulsion after cancellation of SLI program.

Status
Northrop Grumman development of the TR-107 engine permitted consideration for potential use on next-generation launch and space transportation system.

See also
 Merlin 1D
 Raptor

References

External links
 Booster Engine Prototype Project: TR107 Engine Component Technologies
 TR-107 Rendering with explanations
 SLI Prototype engines

Rocket engines using kerosene propellant
Rocket engines using the staged combustion cycle